Patrick Evan Holland (born January 7, 1992) is a Canadian former professional ice hockey player. Holland was selected by the Calgary Flames in the 7th round (193rd overall) of the 2010 NHL Entry Draft and played 5 games in the National Hockey League (NHL) with the Montreal Canadiens. He concluded his professional career with HPK in the Finnish Liiga.

Early life 
Patrick was born in Lethbridge, Alberta on January 7, 1992. He grew up playing in the Lethbridge minor hockey league until he was 15 before playing for the Tri-City Americans in the Western Hockey League.

Playing career
On January 12, 2012, the Calgary Flames traded Holland, along with Rene Bourque and a 2nd round pick at the 2013 NHL Entry Draft (Zach Fucale), to the Montreal Canadiens in exchange for Mike Cammalleri, Karri Ramo, and a 5th round pick at the 2012 NHL Entry Draft (Ryan Culkin).
On March 7, 2012, the Montreal Canadiens signed Holland to a three-year entry-level contract.

In the opening month of the 2013–14 season, Holland played his first NHL game with the Canadiens against the Edmonton Oilers on October 22, 2013.

On October 5, 2014, Holland and Peter Budaj were traded by the Canadiens to the Winnipeg Jets in return for Eric Tangradi.

After one season within the Jets organization, Holland signed a one-year contract in Finland with Liiga club, HPK, on June 16, 2015. Holland appeared in 20 games with HPK, contributing with 9 points.

Opting to end his professional career, Holland enrolled in the University of Victoria in pursuing a degree in Computer Science. He was later recruited to play for the University's men's ice hockey side, the Vikes, in the British Columbia Intercollegiate Hockey League.

Career statistics

References

External links

1992 births
Living people
Calgary Flames draft picks
Canadian ice hockey right wingers
Hamilton Bulldogs (AHL) players
HPK players
Ice hockey people from Alberta
Montreal Canadiens players
Olds Grizzlys players
Ontario Reign (ECHL) players
St. John's IceCaps players
Sportspeople from Lethbridge
Tri-City Americans players
Canadian expatriate ice hockey players in Finland
Victoria Vikes athletes
College ice hockey players